Chahar Mazu (also Romanized as Chāhār Māzū; also known as Chahār Māẕī) is a village in Aq Su Rural District, in the Central District of Kalaleh County, Golestan Province, Iran. At the 2006 census, its population was 192, in 49 families.

References 

Populated places in Kalaleh County